Gomtu is a border town in south-western Bhutan near the border with India. It is located in Samtse District.

At the 2005 census, its population was 4,524.

References 

Populated places in Bhutan
Bhutan–India border crossings